Rod Anderson is a race car driver born in Australia. His racing career started in the 1980s driving historic cars, before he moved on to driving Australian sports cars from 1989 until 1996. He won the Australian Formula Two national series in 1999. After a hiatus he returned to racing in Australian Formula Three's C-Class in 2001, moving up to the B-Class in 2002 and staying there until the present. During his time in Australian F3 he has driven for his own Anderson team. In 2007 he won the Trophy Class of the 2007 Formula 3 title.

References

External links
 

Australian racing drivers
Australian Formula 3 Championship drivers
Australian Formula 2 drivers
Living people
Year of birth missing (living people)